Clayton is a village in the west of the Metropolitan Borough of Doncaster, South Yorkshire, England, on the border with West Yorkshire. It lies to the north of Thurnscoe at an elevation of around 80 metres above sea level.

Together with Frickley, it makes up the civil parish of Clayton with Frickley, which at the 2001 census had a population of 208, increasing to 230 at the 2011 Census.

The Parish Church of All Saints dates back to the 12th century and is a Grade II* listed building.

See also
Listed buildings in Clayton with Frickley

References

External links

Villages in Doncaster